George McGhee may refer to:

 George C. McGhee (1912–2005), American oilman and diplomat
 George Louis McGhee (1925–2000), American marriage and family therapist
 George McGhee (footballer) (1883–1944), English footballer
 George McGhee (media executive), British media executive; see 2009 in British television

See also
McGhee, a surname